The Latvian Brown is a cattle breed that began to be formed when Angeln cattle were imported into Latvia to improve the local, low-productive cattle. 

In 1947 the breed was given a new name - Red-Brown Latvian. By 1980, numbers had reached over one million. 

These cattle vary in color from light-red to dark-red and the bulls can be as heavy as 1000 kilograms (2205 pounds).

References

Further reading 
Oklahoma State University webpage
European Red Dairy Breed Association
Animal Breeders Association of Latvia

Cattle breeds
Cattle breeds originating in Latvia
Fauna of Latvia